St. Alban's Abbey, Mainz (Stift St. Alban vor Mainz) originated as a Benedictine abbey, founded in 787 or 796 by Archbishop Richulf (787–813) in honour of Saint Alban of Mainz, located to the south of Mainz on the hill later called the Albansberg. It was turned into a collegiate foundation (Herrenstift) in 1442. The buildings were entirely destroyed in 1552, although the foundation retained a legal existence until its formal dissolution in 1802.

The abbey was initially renowned for its school, "famous for its teaching and its piety" (pietate doctrinaque inclinitum)  and for its beautiful church. The school was the origin of the Carolingian court school. One of its famous teachers was Rabanus Maurus, born c 780 in Mainz. The importance of the place was reflected in the extraordinary size of the hall. The church was inaugurated on 1 December 805 by Richulf and remained the largest church of Mainz until construction of Mainz Cathedral was begun by Willigis.

History

The abbey was founded near the basilica of Saint Alban founded in 413 and developed as part of the Carolingian Renaissance.

The oldest church on the site was erected during the late Roman period and was a building with a single nave, with an area of exactly 50 by 100 Roman feet. In 805 the Carolingian basilica was consecrated, comprising three naves, but possibly originally without the transept and the two apses. At the western end was a hall the same size as the main nave, above which was a chapel of St. Michael. The two western towers, known from later illustrations, were added in the Romanesque period. The Gothic choir,  erected between 1300 and 1500, was extraordinarily large. The floor plan of Schloss Johannisberg, originally  built as a monastery, reflects a similar construction, because St. Alban's was its mother house. The abbey kept the relics of St. Caesarius of Terracina.

Seventh and eighth centuries
The existence of a monastic community here since the seventh century is proved by gravestones. In 794, even before the completion of the buildings, Fastrada, one of the wives of Charlemagne, was buried here. Charlemagne co-financed the construction. Later the Archbishops of Mainz had their last resting-place here, which was previously, until the time of Saint Boniface, at St. Hilarius's.

Archeological excavations during the years 1907 to 1911 indicated that as early as the Roman period and late antiquity a graveyard with a church existed here. It may be assumed that Saint Alban's grave was among the  discoveries. During an earthquake in 858 parts of the church were destroyed.

Fortification 

The later Archbishop of Mainz (1328–1336) Baldwin of Luxembourg fortified the abbeys of St. Alban's, St. Jakob's and St. Victor's, which at that period were located outside the town walls.

Destruction
St. Alban's was sacked and burnt down on the evening of 28 August 1552 during the Second Margrave War by Albert Alcibiades, Margrave of Brandenburg-Kulmbach. It was not rebuilt. A chapel was constructed from the ruins of the church , which was in its turn severely damaged in the Thirty Years' War and completely destroyed during the siege of Mainz in 1793. In 1802 St. Alban's Abbey, which until then had retained a nominal existence, was formally dissolved under Napoleon.

Today
130 years after its termination the veneration of Saint Alban was revived by the construction of the new St. Alban's parish church, the first church to be built in the Diocese of Mainz after World War I. Nothing remains of the buildings on the original abbey site in the present Oberstadt of Mainz on the Albansberg, but the modern street Auf dem Albansberg approximately follows the foundations of the church.

The precious sacramentary from the abbey's scriptorium is preserved in the collection of valuables in the Martinus-Bibliothek, also in Mainz.

Burials 
Fastrada (d. 794), fourth wife of Charlemagne.
Liutgard of Saxony (died 953), daughter of Emperor Otto I.
Charles of Aquitaine (d. 863), Archbishop of Mainz from 856 to 863.
William, Archbishop of Mainz (d. 968).
Liudolf (d. 957), Duke of Swabia and first son of Otto.

References

 Reinhard Schmidt: Die Abtei St. Alban vor Mainz im hohen und späten Mittelalter. Geschichte, Verfassung und Besitz eines Klosters im Spannungsfeld zwischen Erzbischof, Stadt, Kurie und Reich. (Beiträge zur Geschichte der Stadt Mainz) (Mainz 1996)
 Brigitte Oberle: Das Stift St. Alban vor Mainz. Aspekte der Umwandlung des Benediktinerklosters St. Alban in ein Ritterstift im 15. Jahrhundert. (2005)
Les Ordines Romani du haut moyen âge, Michel Andrieu, Louvain: Spicilegium Sacrum Lovaniense Administration, 1961–1974.
Le Pontifical romano-germanique du dixième siècle, ed. C. Vogel and R. Elze (Studi e Testi vols. 226–7 (text), 266 (introduction and indices), 3 vols., Rome, 1963–72).

External links
 Saint Alban ante Mainz

10th-century churches in Germany
14th-century Roman Catholic church buildings in Germany
Albans
Romanesque architecture in Germany
Monasteries in Rhineland-Palatinate
Christian monasteries established in the 8th century
History of Mainz
Roman Catholic churches in Mainz
Burial sites of the Ottonian dynasty